Father and Son is an outdoor 2005 fountain and sculpture by Louise Bourgeois, installed at Olympic Sculpture Park in Seattle, Washington. It is made of stainless steel, aluminum and features a bronze bell.

Background 
Louse Bourgeois created Father and Son in 2005 after being commissioned by the Seattle Art Museum on behalf of Stu Smailes, a local art philanthropist who died in 2002. Smailes donated $1 million to the city after his death, and requested that it be used to create a sculpture in the city featuring a nude male. Bourgeois collaborated on the design and installation of this piece with ORA, a local architecture studio.

Description 
The 15-foot fountain and sculpture depicts a naked man and a naked boy reaching out to each other. At timed intervals, two separate sides of the fountain will either rise or fall to reveal or obscure one figure or the other.

Controversy 
Father and Son was the first public sculpture in Seattle featuring nude figures. While the SAM’s statement on the artwork focuses on the emotional distance and vulnerability of the two figures, others in the local community saw the sculptures as overtly sexual and pedophilic.

See also

 2005 in art
 List of artworks by Louise Bourgeois

References

External links
 

2000s in Seattle
2005 establishments in Washington (state)
2005 sculptures
Aluminum sculptures in Washington (state)
Bronze sculptures in Washington (state)
Fountains in Washington (state)
Nude sculptures in the United States
Olympic Sculpture Park
Outdoor sculptures in Seattle
Sculptures of children in the United States
Sculptures of men in Washington (state)
Stainless steel sculptures in Washington (state)
Statues in Seattle
Works by Louise Bourgeois